The Valori family belonged to Florence during a period of the Italian Renaissance,  they were prominent in Florentine politics for five generations.

Chapel at San Procolo
The family had a chapel in San Procolo, containing Crucifixion by the artist Filippino Lippi.  The high altar there was painted by Giotto.

Bartolemeo di Filippo
Was born on the  31st of  August 1436, Filippo was on friendly terms with Lorenzo di Medici, and funded Ficino's translation of Plato after the Pazzi conspiracy of 1478. A correspondence written prior to June the 2nd  1484, shows Ficino reports Filippo is having the corpus of Plato published at his own expense.

He was a student of Traversari.

A principal member of the Council of Florence.

Francesco
He was born in 1438 and studied in the Platonic academy of Florence. He married to a lady of the Canigiani family.  He served as ambassador for Florence, and was four time Gonfalonieri di Guistizia. Initially a supporter of the Medici, but upon the death of Lorenzo il Magnifico in 1492, despite his oligarchic aristocratic leanings, he drew closer the partisans of Savonarola. This brought him into conflict with the partisans of the Medici, and as part of the Republican government Francesco pronounced death sentences on some prominent aristocrats linked to an unsuccessful plot to return Piero de' Medici to power, including Lorenzo Tornabuoni, Bernardo del Nero, G. Pucci, G. Cambi, and Niccolo Ridolfi. He had extracted some of this evidence through torture of Lamberto Dell'Antélla. These acts gained him enmity and with the fall of the Savonarola rule in April 1498, he was arrested, but murdered near the San Procolo chapel on route to his jailing at the Signoria by Vincenzio Ridolfi.

Niccolò
Was born sometime during 1464 and died during 1526. He wrote a history of Lorenzo de' Medici, father to Pope Leo X.  He was a nephew to Francesco.

References

Sources

External links

Shepheard Walwyn Publishers Ltd, 1 Aug 2010 - All Things Natural: Ficino on Plato's Timaeus By Marsilio Ficino
 The Civilization of the Italian Renaissance: A Sourcebook (edited by KR. Bartlett)

excerpt from  The diary of Bartolemeo Bibliotecha, Firenze shown in The Society of Renaissance Florence: A Documentary Study - edited by GA. Brucker

Families of Florence